An ongoing inventory of subglacial lakes in Antarctica. Compiled from:

 Discoveries from the 1970's to 2012 via: Wright, A., and Siegert, M. (2012). A fourth inventory of Antarctic subglacial lakes. Antarctic Science 24, 659-664

References

Antarctice subglacial lakes
Antarctic subglacial lakes
subglacial lakes